The Trill: A Journey so Far is the second compilation album by Canadian rapper k-os. The album contains tracks from k-os's first three studio albums as well as some of the hit singles, remixes, and radio edits of a couple singles. The album also contains a leftover track from Yes!.

Track listing
"Crabbuckit" – 3:47
"Sunday Morning (Radio Edit)" - 3:31
"Exit (Call Me)" - 4:01
"The Love Song" - 4:17
"Follow Me" - 3:48
"Equalizer (Go! Remix)" - 3:39 
"Crucial" - 3:27
"ELEctrik HeaT - the seekwiLL" - 3:40
"Born to Run" - 4:51
"Superstarr Pt. 2 (Babylon Girl)" - 3:28
"Man I Used to Be (Radio Remix)" - 3:44
"Flypaper" - 4:11
"Neutroniks" - 3:52
"Heaven Only Knows" - 3:59
"B-Boy Stance" - 4:00
"Dance in Your Car" - 3:54

References

Hip hop compilation albums
K-os albums
2009 compilation albums